Macareus (Ancient Greek: Μακαρεύς Makareus 'happy') or Macar (Ancient Greek: Μάκαρ Makar) was, in Greek mythology, the son of Aeolus, though sources disagree as to which bearer of this name was his father: it could either be Aeolus the lord of the winds, or Aeolus the king of Tyrrhenia. His mother was, at least in the latter case, Amphithea.

Mythology 
Macareus and his sister Canace fell in love with each other and had a child together. Canace was ordered to kill herself and the baby exposed by Aeolus after he had discovered this, and Macareus killed himself.

Macareus, son of Aeolus, is also given as the father of Amphissa or Issa, who was seduced by Apollo in disguise of a shepherd. Ancient sources do not clarify whether she was the child of Macareus by Canace, or a different child by another unknown consort. In Ovid's account the child of Canace apparently doesn't survive.

Notes

Aeolides

References 

 Apollodorus, The Library with an English Translation by Sir James George Frazer, F.B.A., F.R.S. in 2 Volumes, Cambridge, MA, Harvard University Press; London, William Heinemann Ltd. 1921. ISBN 0-674-99135-4. Online version at the Perseus Digital Library. Greek text available from the same website.
Gaius Julius Hyginus, Fabulae from The Myths of Hyginus translated and edited by Mary Grant. University of Kansas Publications in Humanistic Studies. Online version at the Topos Text Project.
 Graves, Robert, The Greek Myths: The Complete and Definitive Edition. Penguin Books Limited. 2017. 
Hesiod, Catalogue of Women from Homeric Hymns, Epic Cycle, Homerica translated by Evelyn-White, H G. Loeb Classical Library Volume 57. London: William Heinemann, 1914. Online version at theio.com
Pausanias, Description of Greece with an English Translation by W.H.S. Jones, Litt.D., and H.A. Ormerod, M.A., in 4 Volumes. Cambridge, MA, Harvard University Press; London, William Heinemann Ltd. 1918. . Online version at the Perseus Digital Library
Pausanias, Graeciae Descriptio. 3 vols. Leipzig, Teubner. 1903.  Greek text available at the Perseus Digital Library.
 Publius Ovidius Naso, Metamorphoses translated by Brookes More (1859-1942). Boston, Cornhill Publishing Co. 1922. Online version at the Perseus Digital Library.
 Publius Ovidius Naso, Metamorphoses. Hugo Magnus. Gotha (Germany). Friedr. Andr. Perthes. 1892. Latin text available at the Perseus Digital Library.
 Publius Ovidius Naso, The Epistles of Ovid. London. J. Nunn, Great-Queen-Street; R. Priestly, 143, High-Holborn; R. Lea, Greek-Street, Soho; and J. Rodwell, New-Bond-Street. 1813. Online version at the Perseus Digital Library.

Princes in Greek mythology
Suicides in Greek mythology
Thessalian mythology
Incest in Greek mythology